Elymian is the extinct language of the ancient Elymian people of western Sicily. Its characteristics are little known because of the extremely limited and fragmentary nature of the surviving texts.

The origins of Elymian and its exact relationships with other languages are unclear due to scarcity of data. It is generally assumed to have been an Indo-European language, but its classification within the Indo-European family is disputed. It has been speculated that Elymian was related to either the Italic languages or the Anatolian languages (such as Hittite), although both theories are disputed.

Characteristics 
Only a handful of Elymian texts have survived, dating from between the 6th and 4th centuries BC. These comprise a few proper names recorded by non-Elymian sources; inscriptions in Greek alphabet on several coins, which include the names of Elymian cities; and inscriptions in Greek alphabet on about 170 fragments of pottery (found mostly in a votive deposit at the ruined Elymian city of Segesta). These texts have been identified as Elymian, based on their evidently non-Hellenic characteristics, location and age.

The majority of textual artefacts are very short and fragmentary, comprising only a few letters. A small number of longer texts apparently contain a personal name and may have been dedicatory epigraphs. They sometimes appear to resemble Hellenic dedicatory epigraphs, in which an anthroponym in genitive form is followed by a verb literally meaning "I am" in order to convey "belonging".

A vase found at Montedoro, around 15 km southwest of Palermo, features one of the few complete inscriptions in Elymian. It has been tentatively translated to read "I [the pot] am [a gift] of Ata Tuka", or "I am [a gift] of Ata of [= son of] Tuka".

Classification 
The inclusion of Elymian within the Indo-European language family is generally accepted, but its further affiliation to the established branches of Indo-European is still disputed. Proposed classifications of the Elymian language can be summarized under two main positions. Some historical linguists agree that some peculiarities of that language – like non-alphabetic symbols engraved on some dedicatory fragments of pots, and genitive in -ai found in almost all the complete sequences – are suggestive of a connection to the Anatolian languages, and in particular, to Hittite. Other historical linguists classify Elymian as related to the Italic languages on the basis of other possible features.

Any resolution of the question of affiliation appears to rely on further archaeological investigations at Elymian settlements in western Sicily.

References

Further reading

 Ambrosini, Riccardo. "Italica o anatolica la lingua dei graffiti di Segesta?". In Studi e Saggi Linguistici, VIII, 1968, 160–172 (In Italian)
 . "Iscrizioni anelleniche di Sicilia, I: Le iscrizioni elime". Firenze, 1977. (In Italian)
  
 
 Durante, Marcello. "L'enigma della lingua degli Elimi". In: AA. VV. Φιλίας χάριν. Miscellanea di studi classici in onore di Eugenio Manni, 1980, III, 881–888. (In Italian)
 Kolb, M. J., Speakman, R. J. (2005). “Elymian Regional Interaction in Iron Age Western Sicily: A. Preliminary Neutron Activation Study of Incised/Impressed Tablewares”. In: Journal of Archaeological Science (JAS) Volume 32, Issue 5. pp. 795–804. https://doi.org/10.1016/j.jas.2005.01.003
 
 Rizzo, Antonino, "Segesta", in 

Languages of Sicily
Pre-Indo-Europeans
Ancient Sicily
Languages of ancient Italy
Extinct languages of Italy
Extinct languages of Europe
Languages extinct in the 3rd century BC
Unclassified languages of Europe
Elymians